Sir Thomas Wode (died 31 August 1502), KS, of Childrey in Berkshire (now in Oxfordshire), was Lord Chief Justice of the Common Pleas from 1500 and in 1478 was elected a Member of Parliament for Wallingford.

Origins
His early life and career are unknown, leading to him being described as 'perhaps the most obscure Chief Justice of the Tudor period'.

Career
His Inn of Court, through process of elimination, was the Middle Temple (as the Middle Temple records for that period are missing, while the records of the other three Inns do not include him), and his first appointment was as a Justice of the Peace for Berkshire in 1478, the same year being returned for Parliament representing Wallingford. He was made a Serjeant-at-law in 1486, and in 1488 a King's Serjeant; it is supposed he then became a member of Serjeant's Inn after this. On 24 November 1495 he was made a Puisne Justice of the Court of Common Pleas, and on 28 October 1500 he was made Lord Chief Justice of the Common Pleas. His presidency of the Court of Common Pleas was short as he died in office on 31 August 1502.

Marriage and children
The name of his wife is unknown, but his daughter and heiress Anne Wode is known to have become the wife of Sir Thomas Stucley (1473-1542) lord of the manor of Affeton in Devon and Sheriff of Devon in 1521. The Stucley family quartered the canting arms of "Wood of Binley", in Devon, given by Sir William Pole (d.1635) as Gules crusily or, three demi-woodmen with clubs or, as visible on the 16th century mural monument in St Branock's Church, Braunton, Devon, to Richard Bellew of Ash, Braunton and his wife Margaret St Leger.

Death and burial
He died on 31 August 1502 and was buried at Reading Abbey in accordance with his will. He bequeathed a gold ring and two books to Thomas Frowyk, who succeeded him as Lord Chief Justice.

References

Chief Justices of the Common Pleas
People from Childrey
Serjeants-at-law (England)
Burials at Reading Abbey
Justices of the Common Pleas
English knights
Year of birth missing
15th-century births
1502 deaths
English MPs 1478
16th-century English judges
16th-century English lawyers